The Cassiterides (meaning "Tin Islands", from κασσίτερος, kassíteros "tin") are an ancient geographical name used to refer to a group of islands whose precise location is unknown, but which was believed to be situated somewhere near the west coast of Europe.

Ancient geography
Herodotus (430 BC) had only vaguely heard of the Cassiterides, "from which we are said to have our tin," but did not discount the islands as legendary. Later writers—Posidonius, Diodorus Siculus, Strabo and others—call them smallish islands off ("some way off," Strabo says) the northwest coast of the Iberian Peninsula, which contained tin mines or, according to Strabo, tin and lead mines. A passage in Diodorus derives the name rather from their nearness to the tin districts of Northwest Iberia. Ptolemy and Dionysios Periegetes mentioned them—the former as ten small islands in northwest Iberia far off the coast and arranged symbolically as a ring, and the latter in connection with the mythical Hesperides. The islands are described by Pomponius Mela as rich in lead; they are mentioned last in the same paragraph he wrote about Cadiz and the islands of Lusitania, and placed in Celtici. Following paragraphs describe the Île de Sein and Britain.

Probably written in the first century BC, the verse Circumnavigation of the World, whose anonymous author is called the "Pseudo-Scymnus," places two tin islands in the upper part of the Adriatic Sea and mentioned the market place Osor on the island of Cres, where extraordinarily high quality tin could be bought. Pliny the Elder, on the other hand, represents the Cassiterides as fronting Celtiberia.

At a time when geographical knowledge of the West was still scanty, and when the secrets of the tin trade were still successfully guarded by the seamen of Gades (modern Cadiz) and others who dealt in the metal, the Greeks knew only that tin came to them by sea from the far West, and the idea of tin-producing islands easily arose. Later, when the West was better explored, it was found that tin actually came from two regions: Galicia, in the northwest of Iberia, and Devon and Cornwall in southwest Britain. Diodorus reports: "For there are many mines of tin in the country above Lusitania and on the islets which lie off Iberia out in the ocean and are called because of that fact the Cassiterides." According to Diodorus tin also came from Britannia to Gaul and then was brought overland to Massilia and Narbo. Neither of these could be called small islands or accurately described as off the northwest coast of Iberia, and so the Greek and Roman geographers did not identify either as the Cassiterides. Instead, they became a third, ill-understood source of tin, conceived of as distinct from Iberia or Britain.

Strabo says that a Publius Crassus was the first Roman to visit the Tin Islands and write a first-hand report. This Crassus is thought to be either the Publius Licinius Crassus who was a governor in Hispania in the 90s, or his grandson by the same name, who in 57–56 BC commanded Julius Caesar's forces in Armorica (Brittany), which places him near the mouth of the Loire river.

Modern attempts at identification

Modern writers have made many attempts to identify them. Small islands off the northwest coast of the Iberian Peninsula, the headlands of that same coast, the Isles of Scilly, Cornwall, and the British Isles as a whole, have all in turn been suggested, but none suits the conditions. Neither the Iberian islands nor the Isles of Scilly contain tin, at least in significant quantities. It seems most probable, therefore, that the name Cassiterides represents the first vague knowledge of the Greeks that tin was found overseas, somewhere in, off, or near Western Europe.

Gavin de Beer has suggested that Roger Dion had solved the puzzle by bringing to bear a chance remark in Avienius' late poem Ora maritima, which is based on early sources: the tin isles were in an arm of the sea within sight of wide plains and rich mines of tin and lead, and opposite two islands — a further one, Hibernia, and a nearer one, Britannia. "Before the estuary of the Loire became silted up in late Roman times, the Bay of Biscay led into a wide gulf, now represented by the lower reaches of the river Brivet and the marshes of the Brière, between Paimboeuf and St. Nazaire, in which were a number of islands. The islands and shores of this gulf, now joined together by silt, are crowded with Bronze Age foundries that worked tin and lead; Pénestin and the tin headland are just north of them; and there can be no doubt that the famous tin islands were there."  De Beer confirms the location from Strabo: the Cassiterides are ten islands in the sea, north of the land of the Artabrians in the northwest corner of Hispania.

E. Thomas from the French BRGM showed in a 2004 report that tin mines were probably operated by the Romans at La Hye, near Ploërmel. This tin might have transited down the Oust river and the Vilaine river to the sea, where it could be transferred on seagoing ships, possibly at Pénestin, giving some support to de Beer's suggestion above.

See also
Tin mining in Britain
Tin sources and trade in ancient times

References

Notes

Primary sources
 Herodotus, Histories 3.115
 Diodorus Siculus, Historical Library V. 21, 22, 38
 Strabo, Geography 2.5.15, 3.2.9, 3.5.11
 Pliny the Elder, Natural History IV. 119, VII. 197, XXXIV. 156–158

Secondary sources
 T. Rice Holmes, Ancient Britain (1907), appendix, identifies the Cassiterides with the British Isles.
 Louis Chauris,  Les anciennes extractions d'étain à Piriac et à Pénestin. Leur place dans l'histoire des exploitations de Cassitérite en Bretagne. , Bulletin de l'Association bretonne, 131e congrès : Le Croisic - Guérande - La Baule, tome 113, 2004, page 380. 
 E. Thomas et al., Carte Géologique de la France - Ploërmel, BRGM, 2004, see p 88-90 
 John Taylor, ''Albion: the earliest history" (Dublin, 2016)
 

Phantom islands of the Atlantic
Classical geography
British Isles
Ancient Greek geography of Britain